is a Japanese football player who currently plays for J3 League club Iwate Grulla Morioka.

Career

Club career 
Nakamura is a product of Kyoto Sanga's youth academy, first entering the club as a ten-year-old. He made his J. League debut on 24 October 2008 in a 2–1 defeat against Kawasaki Frontale, coming on as a substitute for Makoto Kakuda in the 59th minute. He scored his first senior goal for the club in a 2–1 defeat against Yokohama F. Marinos in August 2010. From 2008 till 2011, he made 46 appearances and scored 2 goals in the league for Sanga.

On 11 January 2012 it was announced that Nakamura would be joining Albirex Niigata on loan for the 2012 season.

International career
In August 2009, he was selected to U-20 team for a youth event in Alcúdia.

Career statistics
Updated to 23 February 2018.

References

External links 
Profile at Jubilo Iwata  
Profile at Albirex Niigata  

 

1989 births
Living people
Association football people from Kyoto Prefecture
Japanese footballers
J1 League players
J2 League players
J3 League players
Kyoto Sanga FC players
Albirex Niigata players
Montedio Yamagata players
JEF United Chiba players
Júbilo Iwata players
Omiya Ardija players
Iwate Grulla Morioka players
Association football defenders